The Governor of Cardenal Caro Province was the appointed head of government of the provincial government in Cardenal Caro Province, Chile between 1979 and 2021. The governor was designated by the President.

The first Governor of Cardenal Caro Province was Marcelo Nogueira Hidalgo, appointed by dictator Augusto Pinochet Ugarte, and the last was Carlos Ortega Bahamondes, who was appointed on March 11, 2018 by President Sebastián Piñera Echenique.

History

The history of the province began when, on July 13, 1973, President Salvador Allende decreed the creation of the Cardenal Caro Department, which would become a province on October 3, 1979, as General Augusto Pinochet decreed its creation under the name of Cardenal Caro (Cardinal Caro), in honour of José María Caro Rodríguez, the first Roman Catholic Church Cardinal, who was born in Ciruelos near the province's capital city, Pichilemu. The communes of Litueche (formerly El Rosario), La Estrella, Marchihue, Paredones, and Pichilemu, originally from Colchagua Province; and Navidad, originally from San Antonio Province, formed the province. The first governor of Cardenal Caro was Marcelo Nogueira Hidalgo, who held the office from 1979 until 1990.

List of governors

References

Governor
Governors of provinces of Chile